

Events 
 Summary 
The American Revolutionary War began this year, with the first military engagement being the April 19 Battles of Lexington and Concord on the day after Paul Revere's now-legendary ride. The Second Continental Congress takes various steps toward organizing an American government, appointing George Washington commander-in-chief (June 14), Benjamin Franklin postmaster general (July 26) and creating a Continental Navy (October 13) and a Marine force (November 10) as landing troops for it, but as yet the 13 colonies have not declared independence, and both the British (June 12) and American (July 15) governments make laws.  On July 6, Congress issues the Declaration of the Causes and Necessity of Taking Up Arms and on August 23, King George III of Great Britain declares the American colonies in rebellion, announcing it to Parliament on November 10. On June 17, two months into the colonial siege of Boston, at the Battle of Bunker Hill, just north of Boston, British forces are victorious, but only after suffering severe casualties and after Colonial forces run out of ammunition, Fort Ticonderoga is taken by American forces in New York Colony's northern frontier, and American forces unsuccessfully invade Canada, with an attack on Montreal defeated by British forces on November 13 and an attack on Quebec repulsed December 31.

Human knowledge and mastery over nature advances when James Watt builds a successful prototype of a steam engine, and a scientific expedition continues as Captain James Cook claims the South Georgia and South Sandwich Islands in the south Atlantic Ocean for Britain. Nature's power over humanity is dramatically demonstrated when the Independence Hurricane (August 29 – September 13) devastates the east coast of North America, killing 4,173, and when, on the western side of the North American continent, Tseax Cone erupts in the future British Columbia, as well as when a smallpox epidemic begins in New England. Smallpox was then cured by Edward Jenner.

 January–June 
 January – The Habsburg monarchy forces the Ottoman Empire to cede Bukovina to its rule.
 January 5 – Wolfgang Amadeus Mozart finishes a Sonata for Keyboard in C.
 January 17 – Second voyage of James Cook: Captain James Cook takes possession of South Georgia for the Kingdom of Great Britain.
 February 9 – American Revolution: The Parliament of Great Britain declares the Province of Massachusetts Bay to be in rebellion.
 February 15 – Pope Pius VI succeeds Pope Clement XIV as the 250th pope.
 February 26 – The British East India Company factory on Balambangan Island is destroyed by Moro pirates.
 March 6 – Raghunathrao, Peshwa of the Maratha Empire in India, signs the Treaty of Surat with the British Governor-General Warren Hastings in Bombay ceding the territories of Salsette and Bassein to the British East India Company along with part of the revenues from Surat and Bharuch districts in return for military assistance. This leads to the First Anglo-Maratha War fought between the British and the Marathas, ending with the Treaty of Salbai in 1782.
 March 17 – Catherine the Great of Russia issues a manifesto prohibiting freed serfs from being returned to serfdom.
 March 23 – American Revolution: Patrick Henry, a delegate to the Second Virginia Convention after the Virginia House of Burgesses was disbanded by the Royal Governor, delivers his "Give me Liberty, or give me Death!" speech at St. John's Church in Richmond, Virginia.
 April 18 – American Revolution: Paul Revere and William Dawes, instructed by Dr. Joseph Warren, ride from Boston to Lexington to warn John Hancock and Sam Adams that British forces are coming to take them prisoner and to seize colonial weapons and ammunition in Concord.
 April 19 – American Revolution – Battles of Lexington and Concord: Hostility between Britain and its American colonies explodes into bloodshed, igniting the American Revolutionary War.
 May 10
 American Revolution: The Second Continental Congress meets, elects John Hancock president, raises the Continental Army under George Washington as commander and authorizes the colonies to adopt their own constitutions.
 American Revolution: Ethan Allen and Benedict Arnold, leading the Green Mountain Boys of Vermont, capture Fort Ticonderoga.
 May 17 – American Revolution: The Continental Congress bans trade with Canada.
 June 11 – American Revolutionary War – Battle of Machias: In the first naval engagement of the American Revolution, Patriot forces capture the schooner HMS Margaretta. 
 June 12 – American Revolution:
 The British forces offer a pardon to all colonists who lay down their arms.
 Action by citizens of Machias, Maine, in capturing British ships recognises the existence of a United States Merchant Marine.
 June 14 – American Revolution: The Continental Congress names George Washington as commander of the Continental Army.
 June 16 – The post of Chief Engineer of the Continental Army is created.
 June 17 – American Revolution: Two months into the colonial siege of Boston, British open fire on Breed's Hill on Charles Town Peninsula. After 3 charges, the British take the hill in the misnamed Battle of Bunker Hill.
 June 19 – The post of Commanding General is created by the Continental Congress.

 July–December 

July 3 – American Revolution: George Washington takes command of the 17,000-man Continental Army at Cambridge.
 July 5 – American Revolution: The Continental Congress sends the Olive Branch Petition, hoping for a reconciliation.
 July 6 – American Revolution: The Continental Congress issues Declaration of the Causes and Necessity of Taking Up Arms, which contains the words: "Our cause is just. Our union is perfect... being with one mind resolved to die freemen rather than to live slaves...".
 July 26 –  The Second Continental Congress appoints Benjamin Franklin to be the first Postmaster General of what later becomes the United States Post Office Department.
 July 30 – Second voyage of James Cook:  anchors off the south coast of England, Captain Cook having completed the first eastbound global circumnavigation.
 August 18 – Tucson is founded.
 August 21 – American Revolution – Siege of Fort St. Jean: American rebels launch an invasion of Canada.
 August 23 – American Revolution: Refusing to even look at the Olive Branch Petition, King George issues a Proclamation of Rebellion against the American colonies.
 August 29 – September 12 – The Independence Hurricane from South Carolina to Nova Scotia kills 4,170, mostly fishermen and sailors.
 September 25 – American Revolution: Siege of Fort St. Jean – Battle of Longue-Pointe: Thirteen Colonies revolutionary forces under Maj. Ethan Allen attack Montreal in Quebec, commanded by British General Guy Carleton. Allen's forces are defeated, and Allen himself is captured and held on British ships until he is released.
 October – The Sayre Plotters attempt to kidnap George III of the United Kingdom.
 October 13 – American Revolution: The Continental Congress orders the establishment of the Continental Navy (later the United States Navy).
 October 26 – American Revolution: George III announces to Parliament that the American colonies are in an uprising and must be dealt with accordingly.
 November – American Revolution: Colonel Richard Richardson's South Carolina revolutionaries march through Ninety-Six District in what becomes known as the Snow Campaign, effectively ending all major support for the Loyalist cause in the backcountry of South Carolina.
 November 7 – American Revolution: John Murray, 4th Earl of Dunmore, British royal governor of the Colony of Virginia, signs Dunmore's Proclamation, declaring martial law and offering freedom to slaves of Patriots who run away from their owners and join the Loyalist forces (formal proclamation November 15) thus losing the support of planters who see slaves as their vital livelihood.
 November 10 – American Revolution: The Continental Congress passes a resolution creating the Continental Marines to serve as landing troops for the recently created Continental Navy (the Marines are disbanded at end of the war in April 1783 but reformed on July 11, 1798 as the United States Marine Corps).
 November 13 – American Revolution: Battle of Montreal – American forces under Brigadier General Richard Montgomery capture Montreal. British General Guy Carleton escapes to Quebec.
 November 17 – The city of Kuopio, Finland (belonging to Sweden at this time) is founded by King Gustav III of Sweden.
 December 5 – American Revolution: Henry Knox begins his journey to Cambridge, Massachusetts with the artillery that has been captured from Fort Ticonderoga.
 December 31 – American Revolution: Battle of Quebec – British forces repulse an attack by Continental Army generals Richard Montgomery and Benedict Arnold at Quebec; Montgomery is killed.

 Date unknown 
 Industrial Revolution in Great Britain.
 James Watt's 1769 steam engine patent is extended to June 1800 by Act of Parliament and the first engines are built under it.
 John Wilkinson invents and patents a new kind of boring machine.
 Catherine the Great decrees a Statute for the Administration of the Provinces of the Russian Empire dividing the country into provinces and districts for efficient government.
 A smallpox epidemic begins in New England.
 Tseax Cone in northwestern British Columbia erupts.
 Typhoon Liengkieki devastates the Pacific atoll of Pingelap.
 Wolfgang Amadeus Mozart writes his five violin concertos in Salzburg at about this date.
 The Calcutta Theatre is inaugurated. 
 Shneur Zalman of Liadi founds the Chabad-Lubavitch Hasidic Jewish dynasty.
 Probable date – Jeanne Baret returns to France, becoming the first woman to complete a circumnavigation of the globe.

Births

January–March 
 January 2 – Henry Tufton, 11th Earl of Thanet, English cricketer (d. 1849)
 January 3 – Francis Caulfeild, 2nd Earl of Charlemont, Irish politician (d. 1863)
 January 4
 George Weare Braikenridge, English antiquarian (d. 1856)
 Carlo, Duke of Calabria, Italian prince (d. 1778)
 January 6
 Date Narimura, Japanese daimyō (d. 1796)
 Horace St Paul, English soldier and Member of Parliament (d. 1840)
 January 7 – Thomas Amyot, English antiquarian (d. 1850)
 January 9
 Juan Francisco Larrobla, Uruguayan politician (d. 1842)
 Antonio Villavicencio, statesman and soldier of New Granada (d. 1816)
 January 10 – James Sewall Morsell, United States federal judge (d. 1870)
 January 13 – Stanisław Kostka Zamoyski, Polish noble (d. 1856)
 January 15 – Giosuè Sangiovanni, Italian zoologist (d. 1849)
 January 18
 Pedro Moreno, Mexican soldier (d. 1817)
 Evelyn Pierrepont, British Member of Parliament (d. 1801)
 January 19
 Hudson Gurney, English antiquary and verse-writer (d. 1864)
 George Pyke, Canadian politician (d. 1851)
 January 20 – André-Marie Ampère, French physicist and mathematician (d. 1836)
 January 22
 Manuel García, Spanish singer, teacher and composer (d. 1832)

 January 23
 Pietro Colletta, Neapolitan general and historian (d. 1831)
 José Fernández Salvador, Ecuadorian politician and jurist (d. 1853)
 John Rubens Smith, London-born painter (d. 1849)
 January 27 – Friedrich Wilhelm Joseph Schelling, German philosopher (d. 1854)
 January 28
 Lady Charlotte Bury, English novelist (d. 1861)
 James Brown Mason, American physician and legislator (d. 1819)
 January 30 – Walter Savage Landor, English writer and poet (d. 1864)
 January 31
 Giordano Bianchi Dottula, Italian writer and politician (d. 1846)
 John Richard Farre, English physician (d. 1862)
 February 1
 Philippe de Girard, French engineer and inventor of the first flax spinning frame in 1810 (d. 1845)
 Jochum Nicolay Müller, Norwegian naval officer who (d. 1848)
 February 2 – Gurun Princess Hexiao of the Manchu dynasty (d. 1823)
 February 3
 Maximilien Sébastien Foy, French military leader (d. 1825)
 Louis-François Lejeune, French general, painter and printmaker (d. 1848)
 February 8
 Jacob Liv Borch Sverdrup, Norwegian educator (d. 1841)
 Antonio Bertoloni, Italian botanist who made extensive studies of Italian plants (d. 1869)
 Thomas Liddell, 1st Baron Ravensworth, British politician (d. 1855)
 February 9
 Farkas Bolyai, Hungarian mathematician (d. 1856)
 Theodor Hell, pseudonym of Karl Gottfried Theodor Winkler, German man of letters (d. 1856)
 February 10
 Charles Lamb, English essayist (d. 1834)
 James Wilkes Maurice, British Royal Navy officer during the French Revolutionary and Napoleonic Wars (d. 1857)
 Ádám Récsey, Prime Minister of Hungary (October 3–7, 1848) (d. 1852)
 February 11 – William Hall, American politician (d. 1856)
 February 12 – Charles Lloyd, English poet (d. 1839)
 February 14 – William Clift, English medical illustrator and conservator (d. 1849)
 February 15
 Paul Allen, American author and editor (d. 1826)
 Miguel Ramos Arizpe, Mexican priest (d. 1843)
 February 17
 Heinrich Jacob Aldenrath, German portrait painter (d. 1844)
 Frederick Garling, English attorney and solicitor (d. 1848)
 February 18 – Thomas Girtin, English painter and etcher (d. 1802)
 February 19
 John Bibby, founder of the British Bibby Line shipping company (d. 1840)
 Giovanni Battista Comolli, Italian sculptor (d. 1831)
 February 20
 Guy-Victor Duperré, French naval officer and Admiral of France (d. 1846)
 Israel Gregg, first captain of the historic American steamboat Enterprise (1814) (d. 1847)
 John Starr, merchant and political figure in Nova Scotia (d. 1827)
 February 21
 Jean-Baptiste Girard, French soldier (d. 1815)
 Claudius Herrick, American educator and minister (d. 1831)
 February 22
 William Seymour, United States Representative from New York (d. 1848)
 February 24
 Claudius Hunter, Lord Mayor of London (d. 1851)
 Matěj Kopecký, Czech puppeteer (d. 1847)
 Edward St Maur, 11th Duke of Somerset, English landowner and amateur mathematician (d. 1855)
 February 25 – John Caldwell, businessman and politician in Lower Canada (d. 1842)
 February 26 – Adolf Stieler, German cartographer and lawyer (d. 1836)
 February 28 – Sophie Tieck, German poet (d. 1833)
 March 3 – Henry Prittie, 2nd Baron Dunalley, British politician (d. 1854)
 March 4 – Johann Baptist von Lampi the Younger, Austrian portrait painter (d. 1837)
 March 5
 Charlotte Richardson, English poet (d. 1825)
 Adam Elias von Siebold, German gynecologist (d. 1828)
 March 9
 Jean Kickx, Belgian botanist and mineralogist (d. 1831)
 Constance Mayer, French painter (d. 1821)
 March 10
 Marc-Antoine Jullien de Paris, French journalist (d. 1848)
 Sir David Wedderburn, 1st Baronet, Scottish businessman and politician (d. 1858)
 March 11
 Nils Landmark, Norwegian politician (d. 1859)
 Pierre Jean François Turpin, French botanist and illustrator (d. 1840)
 March 12
 Joseph Chitty, English lawyer and legal writer (d. 1841)
 Henry Eckford, Scottish-born American shipbuilder, naval architect, industrial engineer, entrepreneur (d. 1832)
 Michel Grendahl, Norwegian politician (d. 1849)
 James Welsh, English officer in the Madras Army of the East India Company (d. 1861)
 March 14 – Samuel Street Jr., businessman in Upper Canada (d. 1844)
 March 15 – Juan Bautista Arismendi, Venezuelan patriot and general of the Venezuelan War of Independence (d. 1841)
 March 17 – Ninian Edwards, founding political figure of the state of Illinois (d. 1833)
 March 19 – Ramsay Richard Reinagle, English painter (d. 1862)
 March 22
 Johan Collett, Norwegian politician and public administrator (d. 1827)
 Jack Crawford, British Royal Navy sailor, "Hero of Camperdown" (d. 1831)
 Armand Gouffé, French poet (d. 1845)
 March 23 – William Haseldine Pepys, English physical scientist (d. 1856)
 March 24
 Pauline Auzou, French painter and art instructor (d. 1835)
 Pierre Berthezène, French Army general (d. 1847)
 Muthuswami Dikshitar, South Indian poet and composer (d. 1835)
 March 25 – John Johnston, United States Indian agent (d. 1861)
 March 26 – Thomas Monteagle Bayly, Virginian politician, lawyer and planter (d. 1834)
 March 27 – Nicolai Abraham Holten, Danish civil servant and director of Øresund Custom House (d. 1850)
 March 28 – Johann Heinrich Gossler, Hamburg banker and grand burgher (d. 1842)
 March 30 – Hieronymus Karl Graf von Colloredo-Mansfeld, Austrian corps commander during the Napoleonic Wars (d. 1822)

April–June 
 April 2
 John Higton, English animal painter (d. 1827)
 Calvin Jones, American politician (d. 1846)
 Moses Walton, Virginia farmer serving in both houses of the Virginia General Assembly (d. 1847)
 April 4 – Dutch Sam, British boxer (d. 1816)
 April 5 – Johann Nepomuk Rust, Austrian surgeon (d. 1840)
 April 6 – Edward Wynne-Pendarves, English politician (d. 1853)
 April 7
 Eliza Jumel, American socialite (d. 1865)
 Francis Cabot Lowell, American businessman (d. 1817)
 Louis Barbe Charles Sérurier, French diplomat (d. 1860)
 April 8
 Antoine Charles Cazenove, Swiss-American businessman and diplomat (d. 1852)
 Adam Albert von Neipperg, Austrian general and statesman (d. 1829)
 Thomas Powys, 2nd Baron Lilford, British peer (d. 1825)
 April 9 – Martim Francisco Ribeiro de Andrada, Brazilian politician, leader in Brazil's independence and government (d. 1844)
 April 10 – Carl Wigand Maximilian Jacobi, German psychiatrist (d. 1858)
 April 12
 Christian Samuel Theodor Bernd, German linguist and heraldist (d. 1854)
 Vito Nunziante, Italian general (d. 1836)
 April 13 – Adolph Henke, German physician (d. 1843)
 April 14
 Karl Becker, German philologist (d. 1849)
 John Philip, Scottish-born missionary in South Africa (d. 1851)
 April 16
 Sylvester Maxwell, American lawyer and legislator (d. 1858)
 Charles Stewart, English Anglican bishop in Lower Canada (d. 1837)
 April 21
 Alexander Anderson, American physician and illustrator (d. 1870)
 Edward Smith-Stanley, 13th Earl of Derby, British politician (d. 1851)
 April 22
 Georg Hermes, German Roman Catholic theologian (d. 1831)
 Henry Ryan, US-Canadian Methodist minister (d. 1833)
 April 23 – J. M. W. Turner, English Romantic landscape painter, watercolourist and printmaker (d. 1851)
 April 25
 William Warren Baldwin, Canadian politician (d. 1844)
 Alexander Johnston, Sri Lankan judge (d. 1849)
 Carlota Joaquina of Spain, Queen consort of Portugal (d. 1830)
 April 27 – Pietro Ostini, Catholic cardinal (d. 1849)
 April 28
 William Capel, English sportsman and clergyman (d. 1854)
 Loftus William Otway, British Napoleonic Wars general (d. 1835)
 April 29 – Samuel King, American Presbyterian minister, a founder of the Cumberland Presbyterian Church (d. 1842)
 April 30
 Guillaume Dode de la Brunerie, Marshal of France (d. 1851)
 Calvin Fillmore, American farmer and politician from New York (d. 1865)
 George Kinloch, Scottish reformer and politician (d. 1833)
 May 1 – Angélique Mongez, French Neoclassical artist (d. 1855)
 May 3 – John Hansen Sørbrøden, Norwegian farmer (d. 1857)
 May 5
 Marie-Anne Calame, Swiss vitreous enamel miniaturist and pietist philanthropic educator (d. 1834)
 Johann Christoph Friedrich Klug, German entomologist (d. 1856)
 Alexander McNair, American frontiersman and politician (d. 1826)
 Pablo Morillo, Spanish general (d. 1837)
 May 6
 Hans Henrich Maschmann, Norwegian pharmacist (d. 1860)
 Mary Martha Sherwood, English children's author (d. 1851)
 May 8 – George Gwilt the younger, English architect (d. 1856)
 May 9 – Jacob Brown, United States general (d. 1828)
 May 10
 Antoine Charles Louis de Lasalle, French cavalry general during the Revolutionary and Napoleonic Wars (d. 1809)
 William Phillips, English mineralogist and geologist (d. 1828)
 May 12 – George Whitmore, British Army general (d. 1862)
 May 14 – Micah Brooks, United States general (d. 1857)
 May 17
 Sir John Beckett, 2nd Baronet, British politician (d. 1847)
 Daniel LeRoy, Attorney General for the Michigan Territory (d. 1858)
 May 19 – Antonín Jan Jungmann, Czech physician (d. 1854)
 May 21 – Lucien Bonaparte, French statesman (d. 1840)
 May 24
 Sir Charles Ogle, 2nd Baronet, British Royal Navy officer (d. 1858)
 Matthew Whitworth-Aylmer, 5th Baron Aylmer, British Army general (d. 1850)
 May 25 – Pelagio Palagi, Italian painter (d. 1860)
 May 28 – Thomas Graves, 2nd Baron Graves, British politician (d. 1830)
 May 29 – Nathan Cutler, American politician from Maine (d. 1861)
 May 31
 Charles Digby, British clergyman, Canon of Windsor from 1808 (d. 1841)
 Charles Jackson, American lawyer and jurist (d. 1855)
 June 4 – Francesco Molino, Italian guitarist (d. 1847)
 June 8 – Henry Boehm, American clergyman and pastor (d. 1875)
 June 9 – Georg Friedrich Grotefend, German epigraphist and philologist (d. 1853)
 June 10 – James Barbour, American politician (d. 1842)
 June 12
 Francis Bloodgood, American lawyer, mayor of Albany (d. 1840)
 Johann Baptist Malfatti von Monteregio, Italian-born physician (d. 1859)
 Karl Freiherr von Müffling, Prussian Generalfeldmarschall (d. 1851)
 June 13 – Antoni Radziwiłł, Polish politician (d. 1833)
 June 14 – André Bruno de Frévol de Lacoste, French general of the First Empire (d. 1809)
 June 15
 Elizabeth Benger, English biographer (d. 1827)
 Paul Delano, American-born sea captain (d. 1842)
 Carlo Porta, Italian poet (d. 1821)
 June 16 – Judah Touro, American businessman (d. 1854)
 June 17 – Alexander Cowan, Scottish papermaker and philanthropist (d. 1859)
 June 18 – Orsamus Cook Merrill, American politician (d. 1865)
 June 19
 Vardry McBee, American saddlemaker and philanthropist (d. 1864)
 Friedrich August Peter von Colomb, German general (d. 1854)
 June 20 – Jacques Frédéric Français, French engineer and mathematician (d. 1833)
 June 22
 Johannes Flüggé, German botanist and physician (d. 1816)
 Camillo Ranzani, Italian priest and a naturalist (d. 1841)
 June 24 – John Kempthorne, English clergyman and hymnwriter (d. 1838)
 June 25 – John Stevenson Salt, English barrister, banker and landowner (d. 1845)
 June 26
 Jean-Jacques Desvaux de Saint-Maurice, French general of the Napoleonic Wars (d. 1815)
 John Swaine, English draughtsman and engraver (d. 1860)
 June 29 – Thomas Boyle, American privateer (d. 1825)
 June 30 – William Thompson, Irish philosopher (d. 1833)

July–September 
 July 1 – Cephas Thompson, American artist (d. 1856)
 July 2 – Aaron Peasley, American buttonmaker (d. 1837)
 July 3 – Antoine Philippe, Duke of Montpensier, member of the French royal family (d. 1807)
 July 5 – William Crotch, English composer, organist and artist (d. 1847)
 July 8
 William Davies, United States federal judge (d. 1829)
 Lucy Mack Smith, American prominent in the Latter Day Saints, mother of Joseph Smith (d. 1856)
 July 9 – Matthew "Monk" Lewis, English Gothic horror writer and politician (d. 1818)
 July 11 – Joseph Blanco White, Spanish-born political thinker, theologian and poet (d. 1841)
 July 14
 Louis Ducis, French painter (d. 1847)
 Berkeley Guise, British landowner and Member of Parliament (d. 1834)
 July 15 – Richard Westmacott, British sculptor (d. 1856)
 July 17
 Domingo Eyzaguirre, Chilean politician and philanthropist (d. 1854)
 August Harder, German musician (d. 1813)
 July 18
 Pierre Decouz, French military officer (d. of wounds 1814)
 Karl von Rotteck, German political activist (d. 1840)
 July 19
 Camillo Borghese, 6th Prince of Sulmona (d. 1832)
 John Andrew Shulze, Pennsylvania political leader, sixth Governor of Pennsylvania (d. 1852)
 July 21
 Edward Heneage, English first-class cricketer (d. 1810)
 George Osborne, 6th Duke of Leeds, English peer and politician (d. 1838)
 July 23
 Carl Ludwig Wilhelm Grolman, German jurist (d. 1829)
 Étienne-Louis Malus, French officer (d. 1812)
 July 24 – Eugène François Vidocq, French criminal and private detective agent (d. 1857)
 July 25 – Anna Harrison, American politician (d. 1864)
 July 27 – Therese Brunsvik, Hungarian educationalist (d. 1861)
 July 28 – Hussey Vivian, 1st Baron Vivian, British Army general (d. 1842)
 July 31 – Emmanuel Dupaty, French singer and writer (d. 1851)
 August 2
 William Henry Ireland, English forger (d. 1835)
 José Ángel Lamas, Venezuelan classical musician and composer born in Caracas (d. 1814)
 August 6
 Louis Antoine, Duke of Angoulême, last Dauphin of France (d. 1844)
 Daniel O'Connell, Ireland's predominant political leader (d. 1847)
 Hendrik van Oort, Northern Netherlandish painter (d. 1847)
 August 7
 Maria Brizzi Giorgi, Italian organist (d. 1812)
 Jacob Hoel, Norwegian farmer (d. 1847)
 Henriette Lorimier, popular portraitist in Paris at the beginning of Romanticism (d. 1854)
 August 8 – Richard Blakemore, English politician (d. 1855)
 August 9 – Jacob Brown, United States general (d. 1828)
 August 12 – Conrad Malte-Brun, Danish-born geographer and writer on French politics (d. 1826)
 August 14 – Pieter Adrianus Ossewaarde, Dutch politician (d. 1853)
 August 15
 Carlos de España, Spanish general (d. 1839)
 Carl Franz Anton Ritter von Schreibers, Austrian naturalist, native of Pressburg (d. 1852)
 August 16
 John Carlyle Herbert, American politician (d. 1846)
 Ebenezer Sage, American politician (d. 1834)
 August 18
 James Elliot, American politician (d. 1839)
 Johann Leonhard Pfaff, bishop of the German Roman Catholic Diocese of Fulda from 1832 (d. 1848)
 August 20
 Franz Dinnendahl, German mechanical engineer (d. 1826)
 George Tucker, American politician (d. 1861)
 August 22
 François Péron, French naturalist and explorer (d. 1810)
 August von Vécsey, Austro-Hungarian general (d. 1857)
 August 23 – Mark Cubbon, British army officer with the East India Company (d. 1861)
 August 25 – Karl Joseph Hieronymus Windischmann, German philosopher and anthropologist (d. 1839)
 August 26 – William Joseph Behr, German political radical (d. 1851)
 August 27
 Frederick Graff, American hydraulic engineer (d. 1847)
 Jan Verveer, major general of the Royal Netherlands Army (d. 1838)
 August 28
 Antoine Marc Augustin Bertoletti, Italian general (d. 1846)
 Sophie Gail, French singer and composer (d. 1819)
 August 29 – Niels Wulfsberg, Norwegian publisher (d. 1852)
 August 31
 Agnes Bulmer, English epic poet (d. 1836)
 François de Fossa, French classical guitarist and composer (d. 1849)
 September 1 – Honoré Charles Reille, French general, Marshal of France (d. 1860)
 September 4 – Jean-François Le Gonidec, Breton linguist, Bible translator (d. 1838)
 September 5
 Juan Martín Díez, El Empecinado, Spanish military leader (d. 1825)
 Adolph Ferdinand Gehlen, German chemist (d. 1815)
 September 6 – Aleksey Greig, Russian admiral (d. 1845)
 September 7 – John Jebb, Irish Anglican bishop and religious writer (d. 1833)
 September 8
 John Leyden, Scottish orientalist (d. 1811)
 Vasily Orlov-Denisov, Cossack Russian general (d. 1843)
 September 9
 Guillaume Capelle, French administrator and politician (d. 1843)
 Francisco Ramón Vicuña, President of Chile (d. 1849)
 September 10
 John Kidd, English physician, chemist and geologist (d. 1851)
 Murray Maxwell, British Royal Navy officer (d. 1831)
 September 11
 Narciso Fernández de Heredia, 2nd Count of Heredia-Spínola, Prime Minister of Spain (d. 1847)
 Ferdinand August Freiherr von Hügel, general in the royal Württemberg Infantry (d. 1834)
 September 12 – Josef Jüttner, Austrian cartographer and military officer (d. 1848)
 September 13 – Laura Secord, Canadian heroine of the War of 1812 (d. 1868)
 September 14
 Jean-Louis Burnouf, French philologist and translator (d. 1844)
 John Henry Hobart, third Episcopal bishop of New York from 1816 (d. 1830)
 Joseph Phillimore, English lawyer and Member of Parliament (d. 1855)
 September 15 – William A. Griswold, American lawyer and politician (d. 1846)
 September 16
 Hermano José Braamcamp de Almeida Castelo Branco, Portuguese nobleman and politician (d. 1846)
 Giuseppe Rosaroll, Italian essayist and general in the army of the Kingdom of the Two Sicilies (d. 1825)
 Christian Friedrich Schwägrichen, German botanist specializing in the field of bryology (d. 1853)
 September 17
 Georges Roffavier, French botanist (d. 1866)
 Margrethe Schall, Danish ballerina (d. 1852)
 September 19 – José Félix Ribas, hero of the Venezuelan War of Independence (d. 1815)
 September 20 – François-Pierre Chaumeton, French botanist and physician (d. 1819)
 September 22 – Philip Milledoler, American protestant minister and fifth President of Rutgers College (d. 1852)
 September 23 – Jens Christian Berg, Norwegian lawyer and historian (d. 1852)
 September 24 – Nathan Heald, officer in the United States Army during the War of 1812 (d. 1832)
 September 25 – Pierre Flor, Norwegian politician (d. 1848)
 September 26 – James Grimston, 1st Earl of Verulam, British peer and Member of Parliament (d. 1845)
 September 29
 David McConaughy, American pastor and fourth president of Washington College from 1831 to 1852 (d. 1852)
 François Michel de Rozière, French mining engineer and mineralogist (d. 1842)
 Herbert Taylor, British Army officer (d. 1839)
 September 30 – Robert Adrain, Irish-born American mathematician (d. 1843)

October–December 
 October 2 – Cornelius O'Callaghan, 1st Viscount Lismore, Irish politician (d. 1857)
 October 3 – Isaac von Sinclair, German writer and diplomat (d. 1815)
 October 6 – Johann Anton André, German composer and music publisher (d. 1842)
 October 7
 Ramón Power y Giralt, Puerto Rican politician and Spanish admiral (d. 1813)
 Jaygopal Tarkalankar, Bengali writer and Sanskrit scholar (d. 1846)
 October 9
 Sir Alexander Boswell, 1st Baronet, British politician (d. 1822)
 Lars Johannes Irgens, Norwegian jurist and public official (d. 1830)
 Peter Thonning, Danish physician and botanist (d. 1848)
 Charles Williams-Wynn, British politician (d. 1850)
 October 12
 Lyman Beecher, American Presbyterian minister and patriarch (d. 1863)
 Ludovico Micara, Italian Catholic cardinal (d. 1847)
 October 13 – John Wentworth Loring, British Royal Navy admiral (d. 1852)
 October 14 – Godfrey Macdonald, 3rd Baron Macdonald of Sleat, Scottish general (d. 1832)
 October 15
 Bernhard Crusell, Swedish-Finnish clarinetist and composer 1838)
 Alberto Lista, Spanish poet and educationalist (d. 1848)
 Bernardo Peres da Silva, governor of Portuguese India (d. 1844)
 October 17 – Ole Paulssøn Haagenstad, Norwegian politician (d. 1866)
 October 18
 Martial Aubertin, French stage actor and dramatist (d. 1824)
 Dawson Turner, English banker and botanist (d. 1858)
 John Vanderlyn, American artist (d. 1852)
 October 19
 Jean-Baptiste Faribault, Lower Canadian trader with the Indians and early settler in Minnesota (d. 1860)
 Kamma Rahbek, Danish salon holder (d. 1829)
 October 21
 Giuseppe Baini, Italian priest, music critic and composer (d. 1844)
 Bartholomew Crannell Beardsley, Canadian politician, lawyer and judge (d. 1855)
 October 23 – Gottlob Friedrich Thormeyer, German architect (d. 1842)
 October 24 – Bahadur Shah II, Mughal emperor (d. 1862)
 October 26
 Charles Douglas, 3rd Baron Douglas, English amateur cricketer (d. 1848)
 Hans Moritz Hauke, German-Polish general (d. 1830)
 Joseph Nightingale, prolific English writer and preacher (d. 1824)
 Alexander Thom, Scottish military surgeon, judge and politician in Upper Canada (d. 1845)
 October 30
 Catterino Cavos, Russian composer (d. 1840)
 Wilhelm Ludwig Viktor Henckel von Donnersmarck, Prussian officer who fought in the Napoleonic Wars (d. 1849)
 November 1 – Christian Adolph Diriks, Norwegian lawyer and statesman (d. 1837)
 November 2
 Jean-Emmanuel Jobez, French businessman and politician (d. 1828)
 Jeromus Johnson, American politician (d. 1846)
 November 3 – Edward Paget, British Army generak (d. 1849)
 November 4 – Pierre Capelle, French chansonnier (d. 1851)
 November 6 – August Wilhelm Hartmann, Danish composer (d. 1850)
 November 7 – Joseph Fox, English dental surgeon (d. 1816)
 November 8
 Achille Fontanelli, Italian nationalist and Napoleonic general (d. 1838)
 Jacob Peter Mynster, Danish theologian and Bishop of Zealand (d. 1854)
 November 9 – Daniel Waldron, American businessman (d. 1821)
 November 10 – James Elliot, American politician (d. 1839)
 November 11 – Gulbrand Eriksen Tandberg, Norwegian farmer and politician (d. 1848)
 November 13
 John Burns, Scottish surgeon (d. 1850)
 Richard Butler, 1st Earl of Glengall, Irish peer (d. 1819)
 Rémi Joseph Isidore Exelmans, distinguished French soldier of the Revolutionary and Napoleonic Wars (d. 1852)
 November 14 – Paul Johann Anselm Ritter von Feuerbach, German legal scholar (d. 1833)
 November 15 – James Carnahan, American clergyman and educator, ninth President of Princeton University (d. 1859)
 November 19
 Johann Karl Wilhelm Illiger, German entomologist and zoologist (d. 1813)
 François Antoine Teste, French officer during the Napoleonic Wars (d. 1862)
 November 20 – Gustav Anton von Seckendorff, German author (d. 1823)
 November 21 – Josef Servas d'Outrepont, German obstetrician (d. 1845)
 November 23
 Clemens Wenzeslaus Coudray, German neoclassical architect (d. 1845)
 Johann Georg Rist, Danish author (d. 1847)
 Maria Anna of Naples and Sicily, member of the French Royal Family (d. 1780)
 November 24 – Peter Buell Allen, politician and military commander in New York State, pioneer of Vigo County and Terre Haute (d. 1833)
 November 25
 Joseph Borremans, Belgian composer (d. 1858)
 Michel Étienne Descourtilz, French physician, botanist and historiographer of the Haitian revolution (d. 1835)
 Jean Baptiste Godart, French entomologist (d. 1825)
 Gustaf Gabriel Hällström, Finnish scientist (d. 1844)
 Charles Kemble, Welsh-born English actor of a prominent theatre family (d. 1854)
 November 27
 Jean-Françoìs de Dompierre de Jonquières, Dutch-Danish merchant (d. 1820)
 Lauritz Weidemann, Norwegian politician (d. 1856)
 November 28
 William Frere, English lawyer and academic (d. 1836)
 Jean-Charles Létourneau, notary and political figure in Lower Canada (d. 1838)
 November 29 – Marie Antoine de Reiset, French general during the French Revolutionary Wars and the Napoleonic Wars (d. 1836)
 November 30 – Jean Joseph Antoine de Courvoisier, French magistrate and politician (d. 1835)
 December 2 – Joseph Denis Odevaere, Neo-Classical painter from the Southern Netherlands (modern-day Belgium) (d. 1830)
 December 5 – Abijah Bigelow, American politician (d. 1860)
 December 6
 Sir Charles Blunt, 4th Baronet, British Member of Parliament (d. 1840)
 Nicolas Isouard, Maltese composer (d. 1818)
 December 10
 José María de la Cueva, 14th Duke of Albuquerque, Spanish general and ambassador (d. 1811)
 Giacomo Filippo Fransoni, Catholic cardinal (d. 1856)
 Jacques-Antoine Manuel, French lawyer (d. 1827)
 December 11 – Peter Little, American politician (d. 1830)
 December 13 – Theodor Gottlieb von Hippel the Younger, Prussian statesman (d. 1843)
 December 14
 Philander Chase, American Episcopal Church bishop, educator and pioneer (d. 1852)
 Thomas Cochrane, 10th Earl of Dundonald, British Royal Navy admiral (d. 1860)
 December 15 – Phineas Riall, British Army general (d. 1850)
 December 16
 Ciro Annunchiarico, Italian cult leader (d. 1817)
 Jane Austen, English novelist (d. 1817)
 François-Adrien Boïeldieu, French composer (d. 1834)
 John Fullerton, Lord Fullerton, Scottish law lord (d. 1853)
 December 17 – Carlo Rossi, Russian architect (d. 1849)
 December 20
 Samuel Farrow, American politician (d. 1824)
 Pierre Antoine François Huber, brigadier general in the French army (d. 1832)
 December 21 – Julien-Joseph Virey, French naturalist and anthropologist (d. 1846)
 December 25
 John Fitzgerald, British Member of Parliament (d. 1852)
 Peter Reesor, American-born Mennonite settler in Ontario (d. 1854)
 Antun Sorkočević, Croatian composer, writer and diplomat (d. 1841)
 December 26 – Anton Carl Ludwig von Tabouillot, French officer, nobleman and counter-revolutionary (d. 1813)
 December 28
 João Domingos Bomtempo, Portuguese musician (d. 1842)
 Jean-Gabriel Eynard, Swiss banker (d. 1863)
 Pierre François Étienne Bouvet de Maisonneuve, French admiral (d. 1860)
 Date unknown – Jeanne Geneviève Garnerin, French balloonist and parachutist (d. 1847)

Deaths

January 
 January 1 – Ahmad Shah Bahadur, 13th Mughal Emperor (b. 1725)
 January 2
 St George St George, 1st Baron St George, Irish politician (b. 1710)
 William Napier, 7th Lord Napier, British noble (b. 1730)
 January 3
 Henry Beekman, New York landowner and provincial assemblyman (b. 1687)
 Robert Campbell, Nova Scotia politician (b. 1718)
 January 6 – Khawaja Muhammad Zaman of Luari, Sindhi Sufi poet (b. 1713)
 January 8 – John Baskerville, British printer (b. 1706)
 January 10
 Stringer Lawrence, Early British military leader in India (b. 1697)
 Yemelyan Pugachev, leader of a Russian peasant uprising (b. 1742)
 January 11
 Indra Kumari Devi, Queen consort of Nepal (b. 1724)
 Queen Narendra of Nepal, Queen consort of Gorkha (b. 1723)
 Prithvi Narayan Shah, last ruler of the Gorkha Kingdom in the Indian subcontinent (b. 1723)
 January 13 – Johann Georg Walch, German theologian (b. 1693)
 January 14 – Peter Schenk the Younger, Dutch engraver and map publisher in Leipzig (b. 1693)
 January 15 – Giovanni Battista Sammartini, Italian composer (b. 1700)
 January 17 – Vincenzo Riccati, Venetian mathematician and physicist (b. 1707)
 January 20
 Sebastian Klotz, German violin maker (b. 1696)
 Sir George Oxenden, 5th Baronet, English politician (b. 1694)
 January 21 – Isaac de Forcade de Biaix, Prussian colonel (b. 1704)
 January 25
 Bernardo de Rossi, Italian theologian (b. 1687)
 Georg Friedrich Schmidt, German artist (b. 1712)
 January 26
 Domingo de Bonechea, Spanish explorer (b. 1713)
 Johann Gregor Herold, German painter (b. 1696)
 Shuja-ud-Daula, Subedar Nawab of Oudh, India (b. 1732)
 January 29 – Henry Willoughby, 16th Baron Willoughby of Parham, Peer in House of Lords (b. 1696)

February 
 February 1 – Nicholas Herbert, British Member of Parliament (b. 1706)
 February 2 – Sir John Rushout, 4th Baronet, British politician (b. 1685)
 February 4 – John Ryder, Irish Anglican bishop (b. 1697)
 February 5 – Eusebius Amort, German Roman Catholic theologian (b. 1692)
 February 6 – William Dowdeswell, British politician (b. 1721)
 February 7 – Mary Butterworth, British counterfeiter in colonial America (b. 1686)
 February 9 – Princess Hejing, manchu princess of the Qing Dynasty (b. 1756)
 February 10 – Claude Pouteau, French surgeon and inventor (b. 1724)
 February 15
 Peter Dens, Belgian Catholic theologian (b. 1690)
 Diego Fernández, harpischord maker of the Spanish court (b. 1703)
 February 16 – Jean-Baptiste Vivien de Châteaubrun, French dramatist and playwright (b. 1686)
 February 24 – Ferdinando Colonna of Stigliano, 2nd Prince of Sonnino (b. 1695)
 February 25 – William Small, Scottish physician and professor of natural philosophy (b. 1734)
 February 28
 Paul Cardale, British minister (b. 1705)
 Margaret Coke, Countess of Leicester, British peeress (b. 1700)
 Empress Xiaoyichun, Qing Dynasty empress (b. 1727)

March 
 March 2 – Nikolaos Doxaras, Greek artist (b. 1710)
 March 3 – Richard Dunthorne, British astronomer (b. 1711)
 March 5 – Pierre-Laurent Buirette de Belloy, French actor and dramatist (b. 1727)
 March 6
 Job Baster, Dutch naturalist (b. 1711)
 Gaudenzio Botti, Italian painter (b. 1698)
 March 7
 John Boyle, 3rd Earl of Glasgow, British Earl (b. 1714)
 Thomas Nuthall, English lawyer and politician (b. 1720)
 March 20 – Pedro Antonio Barroeta y Ángel, Spanish Catholic priest, Archbishop of Lima, Archbishop of Granada (b. 1701)
 March 21 – Thomas Penn, son of William Penn, founder of the Province of Pennsylvania (b. 1702)
 March 22
 Peter August, Duke of Schleswig-Holstein-Sonderburg-Beck (b. 1697)
 Hendrik Carré II, Dutch painter (b. 1696)
 March 23 – Anne Catherine Hoof Green, American printer and publisher (b. 1720)
 March 30
 William Irby, 1st Baron Boston, British peer (b. 1707)
 Christian Ditlev Reventlow, Danish Privy Councillor (b. 1710)
 March 31 – Samuel Heathcote, British Member of Parliament (b. 1699)

April 
 April 4 – René Charles de Maupeou, French statesman (b. 1688)
 April 5 – Simon Nikolaus Euseb von Montjoye-Hirsingen, Prince Bishop of Basel (b. 1693)
 April 7 – Sir Anthony Abdy, 5th Baronet, 5th Abdy Baronet (b. 1720)
 April 10
 Jonas Haas, German-born Danish engraver (b. 1720)
 Louis-Florent de Vallière, Governor General of the French colony of Saint-Domingue, now Haiti (b. 1721)
 April 11
 Meletie Covaci, Roman Catholic bishop (b. 1707)
 Roger Mostyn, English churchman, Canon of Windsor (b. 1720)
 April 12
 William Kerr, 4th Marquess of Lothian, Scottish nobleman (b. 1710)
 Pierre Soubeyran, Genevan-French engraver and copperplate engraver (b. 1709)
 William Vaughan, Welsh politician (b. 1707)
 April 14 – Countess Palatine Ernestine of Sulzbach, Landgravine and Carmelite nun (b. 1697)
 April 16 – William Leyborne Leyborne, governor of the Windward Islands (b. 1744)
 April 19 – Isaac Davis, American gunsmith and militia officer (b. 1745)
 April 24 – Jan Caspar Philips, engraver from the Northern Netherlands (b. 1690)
 April 26 – Josiah Quincy II, American lawyer (b. 1744)
 April 27 – Peter Boehler, Moravian missionary (b. 1712)
 April 30
 Francesco Barsanti, Italian flautist, oboist and composer (b. 1690)
 Peter Harrison, English-born colonial American architect (b. 1716)

May 
 May 1 – Israel Lyons, English mathematician and botanist (b. 1739)
 May 2
 Mary Montagu, Duchess of Montagu, wife of George Brudenell Montagu, Duke of Montagu (b. 1711)
 Fredericka of Saxe-Gotha-Altenburg, duchess consort of Saxe-Weissenfels (b. 1715)
 May 3 – George Boscawen, British Army general (b. 1712)
 May 5
 John Blennerhassett, Anglo-Irish politician (b. 1691)
 Benjamin Dass, Norwegian teacher and book collector (b. 1706)
 May 7 – Cornelius Heinrich Dretzel, German organist and composer (b. 1697)
 May 9
 Domingo de Basavilbaso, Argentinian businessperson (b. 1709)
 Vittoria Tesi, Italian opera singer and music teacher (b. 1701)
 May 10
 Marie Magdalene Charlotte Ackermann, German actress (b. 1757)
 Caroline Matilda of Great Britain, Queen consort of Denmark and Norway, 1766–1772 (b. 1751)
 Samuel of Constantinople, Ecumenical Patriarch of Constantinople (b. 1700)
 Caroline Matilda, British princess, queen consort of Denmark (b. 1751)
 May 15
 Hans-Friedrich von Krusemark, Lieutenant General in the Prussian Army of Frederick the Great (b. 1720)
 Johann Daniel Ritter, German historian (b. 1709)
 May 16 – Ulla von Liewen, Swedish courtier and baroness (b. 1747)
 May 17 – Carlo Carlone, painter (b. 1686)
 May 18
 Magnus Beronius, Archbishop of Uppsala in the Church of Sweden (b. 1692)
 Johann Joachim Kändler, German artist (b. 1706)
 May 25 – Karl Gottlieb Guichard, German writer (b. 1724)
 May 27 – Louise Élisabeth de Bourbon, French noblewoman (b. 1693)
 May 28 – Barlow Trecothick, English merchant and politician (b. 1719)
 May 30 – Jean Capperonnier, French classical scholar (b. 1716)

June 
 June 5 – Giovanni Gaetano Bottari, Italian scholar and critic (b. 1689)
 June 6 – Sir Charles Burton, 1st Baronet, Anglo-Irish politician (b. 1702)
 June 11 – Egidio Duni, Italian composer (b. 1708)
 June 15 – Asa Pollard, American soldier (b. 1735)
 June 17
 Andrew McClary, soldier and major in the Continental Army during the American Revolution (b. 1730)
 John Pitcairn, British Marine officer during the American Revolutionary War (b. 1722)
 Joseph Warren, American doctor (b. 1741)
 June 19 – Andrew Barclay, Scottish-American merchant (b. 1719)
 June 21 – Charles, Prince of Nassau-Usingen and Nassau-Saarbrücken (b. 1712)
 June 23
 James Abercrombie, British army officer, died during the American Revolutionary War (b. 1732)
 Karl Ludwig von Pöllnitz, German soldier, adventurer and writer (b. 1692)
 June 26 – Aryeh Leib Epstein, Polish rabbi (b. 1708)
 June 27
 Ignaz Günther, German sculptor and woodcarver (b. 1725)
 Robert Livingston, member of New York colonial assembly (b. 1688)
 June 29 – Anna Smitshuizen, Dutch prostitute, victim of a cause célèbre murder (b. 1751)
 June 30 – Charles Maynard, 1st Viscount Maynard, British noble (b. 1690)

July 
 July 3 – Thomas Gardner, American politician and colonel (b. 1724)
 July 11 – Simon Boerum, American Continental Congressman (b. 1724)
 July 13
 Louis Charles, Count of Eu, member of the French Capetian dynasty (b. 1701)
 John Ratcliffe, English academic, Master of Pembroke College, Oxford (b. 1700)
 July 15 – Servais Duriau, Belgian Cistercian monk (b. 1701)
 July 18 – Joseph Knight, senior Royal Navy officer, served as East Indies Station (b. c. 1708)
 July 20 – Enrico Albrici, Italian painter (b. 1714)
 July 21
 Robert Bolling, American politician (b. 1738)
 Szymon Czechowicz, prominent Polish Baroque painter (b. 1689)
 July 22 – Thomas Lockhart, politician (b. 1739)
 July 24 – John Pollen, British Member of Parliament (b. 1702)

August 
 August 4 – Sir Gregory Page, 2nd Baronet, English art collector and landowner (b. 1689)
 August 5 – Maharaja Nandakumar, tax official (b. 1705)
 August 9 – Johann Ernst Gotzkowsky, Prussian merchant, art dealer and diplomat (b. 1710)
 August 10
 Elihu Adams, soldier in the Continental Army during the American Revolutionary War (b. 1741)
 César de Missy, Prussian book collector and theologian (b. 1703)
 August 12 – Remember Baker, American soldier, member of the Green Mountain Boys (murdered) (b. 1737)
 August 13 – Michał Fryderyk Czartoryski, Polish nobleman (b. 1696)
 August 14 – Laurens Storm van 's Gravesande, Dutch governor of the colonies of Essequibo and Demerara (b. 1704)
 August 16 – Jakob Langebek, Danish historian (b. 1710)
 August 21 – Zahir al-Umar, Arab ruler of northern Palestine (b. 1689)
 August 25 – Felipe de Castro, Spanish sculptor (b. 1711)
 August 27 – James Burgh, British Whig politician and writer (b. 1714)
 August 28 – James Habersham, Merchant and politician in the British colony of Georgia (b. 1712)
 August 29 – Francesco Sleter, Italian painter (b. 1685)
 August 30 – George Faulkner, Irish publisher and bookseller (b. 1699)

September 
 September 2 – Antoine Touron, French historian (b. 1686)
 September 4 – Al-Mahdi Abbas, Imam of Yemen (b. 1719)
 September 6 – Jean-Baptiste Bullet, French writer (b. 1699)
 September 8 – John Conyers, English politician (b. 1717)
 September 12 – Charles-Louis Mion, French composer (b. 1699)
 September 13
 Klaas Annink, Dutch serial killer (executed) (b. 1710)
 Guillaume Mazeas, French physicist (b. 1720)
 Constantine Phipps, 1st Baron Mulgrave, Irish Baron (b. 1722)
 September 14 – Janusz Aleksander Sanguszko, Court Marshal of Lithuania (b. 1712)
 September 16 – Allen Bathurst, 1st Earl Bathurst, English privy councillor (b. 1684)
 September 17
 Charles Allanson, British Member of Parliament (b. 1720)
 John Parker, American colonial farmer, smith and soldier (b. 1729)
 September 21 – Abel Prescott Jr., American Patriot (b. 1749)
 September 23 – John Bentinck, British naval officer, inventor and MP (b. 1737)
 September 24
 Emanuel Büchel, Swiss graphic artist, aquarellist, topographer and baker (b. 1705)
 Polixénia Daniel, Hungarian noble and writer (b. 1720)
 September 28 – Ukawsaw Gronniosaw, writer and enslaved man (b. 1710)

October 
 October 2 – Fukuda Chiyo-ni, Japanese haiku poet and Buddhist nun (b. 1703)
 October 3 – Cluer Dicey, English newspaper proprietor and patent medicine vendor (b. 1715)
 October 5 – Amos Adams, Anglican clergy (b. 1728)
 October 10 – Louis Nicolas Victor de Félix d'Ollières, Marshal of France (b. 1711)
 October 13 – James Cholmondeley, British Army officer, Member of Parliament (b. 1708)
 October 14 – Gilles Joubert, French master cabinetmaker (b. 1689)
 October 16
 Peter van Hurk, Danish merchant (b. 1697)
 Antti Piimänen, Finnish churchbuilder (b. 1712)
 October 18
 Michael Cresap, Continental Army officer (b. 1742)
 Paul of the Cross, Italian mystic (b. 1694)
 Christian August Crusius, German philosopher and theologian (b. 1715)
 October 20 – Sir John Molesworth, 5th Baronet, British Member of Parliament (b. 1729)
 October 21
 François-Hubert Drouais, French painter (b. 1727)
 Maria Wilhelmina von Neipperg, Mistress of Austrian royalty (b. 1738)
 Sakai Tadamochi, 酒井忠用 Daimyo (b. 1723)
 October 22 – Peyton Randolph, planter and public official from the Colony of Virginia (b. 1721)
 October 27 – Johan Maurits Mohr, Dutch-German pastor and astronomer (b. 1716)
 October 29 – Gabriel François Venel, French chemist (b. 1723)

November 
 November 1 – Pierre-Joseph Bernard, French writer (b. 1708)
 November 2 – Noble Jones, British American politician (b. 1702)
 November 3 – Juan José Pérez Hernández, Spanish explorer (b. 1725)
 November 5
 Tysoe Hancock, English physician (b. 1723)
 Christian IV, Count Palatine of Zweibrücken, German noble (b. 1722)
 Luis Jayme, Spanish-born Franciscan (b. 1740)
 November 6
 Peter Burrell, British politician (b. 1724)
 Guillaume de Barrême de Châteaufort, French painter (b. 1719)
 November 7
 Johann Gottfried Hildebrandt, organ builder (b. 1724)
 François Rebel, French composer (b. 1701)
 November 9 – Francisco Ximénez de Tejada, Spanish knight, 69th Grandmaster of the Knights Hospitaller (b. 1703)
 November 12 – John Smith, English politician (b. 1727)
 November 13 – Jeanne Camus de Pontcarré, French aristocrat and eccentric widow (b. 1705)
 November 21 – John Hill, English author and botanist (b. 1716)
 November 22 – Claude-Henri de Fusée de Voisenon, French dramatist and writer (b. 1708)
 November 24 – Lorenzo Ricci, Superior General of the Society of Jesus (b. 1703)
 November 25
 Jacob Benzon, Norwegian judge (b. 1688)
 Richard Spry, British Royal Navy officer, North America and West Indies Station (b. 1715)
 November 28 – Thomas Elfe, British cabinet-maker (b. 1719)
 November 29 – Juan Curiel, Spanish intellectual and politician (b. 1690)

December 
 December 3 – Giovanni Bianchi, Italian physician and zoologist (b. 1693)
 December 7
 Charles Saunders, British politician (b. 1715)
 Fabrizio Serbelloni, Catholic cardinal (b. 1695)
 December 8 – Josef Ignaz Mildorfer, Austrian painter (b. 1719)
 December 9
 Pietro Gnocchi, Italian composer (b. 1689)
 Robert Livingston, landowner and politician in Colonial America (b. 1718)
 December 15
 Marie-Angélique Memmie Le Blanc, French feral child (b. 1712)
 Princess Tarakanova, Pretender to the Russian throne (b. 1753)
 December 16 – Gustavus Hamilton, Irish painter (b. 1739)
 December 20 – Sigismund Streit, German art collector (b. 1687)
 December 21 – Theresa Parker, English art patron (b. 1745)
 December 28
 John Campbell, Scottish author (b. 1708)
 Petrus Albertus van der Parra, Dutch colonial governor (b. 1714)
 John Phillips, English master carpenter and architect (b. 1709)
 December 31
 Richard Montgomery, American general (killed in battle) (b. 1738)
 Anna Vorontsova, Russian lady-in-waiting (b. 1722)

 Date unknown – Sarah Buttall, English silversmith

References

Further reading 
 Norton, Mary Beth. 1774: The Long Year of Revolution (2020). America to April 1775 online review by Gordon S. Wood
 Phillips, Kevin. ''1775: A Good Year for Revolution' (Viking, 2012.